The position of the Head of the Chuvash Republic, known as the President of the Chuvash Republic until 2011, is the highest office within the Government of the Chuvash Republic in Russia. The Head is elected directly by the people. Term of service is five years.

List of officeholders 

The latest election for the office was held on 13 September 2020.

References

Notes

External links
Russian republics

 
Politics of Chuvashia
Chuvash